KM Pekan is an offshore patrol vessel operated by the Malaysian Coast Guard. The ship was built as the Ojika for the Japanese Coast Guard in 1990–1991, but was renamed Erimo in 1999. In Malaysia service, it is the largest vessel in Malaysian Coast Guard.

Description
Displacement was  normal and  full load.

This ship has a crew of 50 and endurance of 30 days. To fulfill the patrol duty, KM Pekan also has a helicopter deck to operate one medium-sized helicopter.

Construction and career
The ship was ordered in November 1989 as the lead ship of her class of large patrol vessel for the Japanese Maritime Safety Agency. She was laid down by Mitsui at their Tamano shipyard on 28 September 1990, was launched with the name Ojika on 23 April 1991 and commissioned on 3 October 1991. The Marine Safety Agency was renamed the Japan Coast Guard in April 2000, and Ojika was renamed Erimo on 1 October 2000.

Citations

References
 
 

Patrol vessels of Malaysia
1991 ships
Ships built by Mitsui Engineering and Shipbuilding